Michael Milton may refer to:

Michael A. Milton (born 1958), American theologian
Michael Milton (cricketer) (born 1943), English cricketer
Michael Milton (skier) (born 1973), Australian Paralympic skier and cyclist